Nathaniel "Nate" Oliver (born April 13, 1980) is an American ice hockey executive, currently serving as General Manager of the Buffalo Beauts in the Premier Hockey Federation (PHF). Prior to his role as General Manager, Oliver served as the Beauts’ Community Relations Manager for one season. Oliver is also an associate director with Campus Living at the University at Buffalo. Before joining the Buffalo Beauts in 2019, Oliver was a sports journalist, having covered the game for The Hockey Writers.

Hockey career

Buffalo Beauts
Oliver was hired as general manager the Buffalo Beauts on May 12, 2020, becoming the fourth GM in franchise history. He replaced Mandy Cronin, who left the position to become GM of the expansion Toronto Six.  

The first player signed by Oliver was Dominique Kremer. In May 2022, he re-signed Kremer to the first two-year deal in league history. Six days later, on May 9, 2022, he signed Mikyla Grant-Mentis, the reigning league MVP, to the largest single-season contract in league history, valued at $80,000 USD.  

Other players signed by Oliver while serving as Beauts GM include Autumn MacDougall, an alum of the Alberta Pandas women's ice hockey program, also the first player from U Sports women's ice hockey to be drafted into the PHF. 

In Oliver’s first draft as general manager, in 2021, the players he selected included RMU Colonials alumnae Emilie Harley (2nd overall) and Anjelica Diffendal (7th overall).   With three consecutive picks at 13, 14 and 15, Oliver took Kennedy Ganser, Anna Zíková and Missy Segall. Holy Cross forward Allison Attea went 19th overall, while Oliver’s last pick made draft history. Selecting Castleton University’s Casey Traill, the first player in university history to be drafted into professional hockey, she was the first-ever British player in the draft. Additionally, Oliver selected Swedish goaltender Lovisa Berndtsson with the first ever selection in the PHF's International Draft.

Personal
Oliver considers his closest friend in hockey to be Finnish Olympian and HPK team manager Maija Hassinen-Sullanmaa and he credits her as one of the main influences in his becoming a professional women's hockey GM.

References 

1980 births
Living people
American ice hockey administrators
Buffalo Beauts
Ice hockey executives
Ice hockey people from New York (state)
Sportspeople from Buffalo, New York
Sportswriters from New York (state)
University at Buffalo people